Richard Bozulich (born 1936) is an American author, publisher of Go books in English and college math professor. He co-founded the Ishi Press. He has worked with several Japanese professional players.
He has a regular go column in The Daily Yomiuri, Japan's largest English-language newspaper. He lives in Chigasaki, Japan.
In 2012 Bozulich was a candidate for Comptroller of New York City for the War Veterans Party.

From university 
Bozulich was born in Los Angeles, California. He attended UCLA and in 1966 graduated from the University of California, Berkeley with a BA in mathematics. Bozulich had worked his way through college by buying and selling highly technical used books and upon graduation decided to become a book publisher.

Ishi press 
He moved to Japan and in 1968 in partnership with Stuart Dowsey founded The Ishi Press, a book and magazine publishing company that primarily published books about the game of go.

Ishi Press' first few publications were translations of Japanese books such as Eio Sakata's The Middle Game of Go and Modern Joseki and Fuseki Vol. I and II but Bozulich soon began working with Japanese professional players, as well as principal collaborators James Davies and John Power, to produce original works in English. The first of these, Basic techniques of Go by Nagahara and Haruyama, was published in 1969. In 1973, Bozulich began work on a seven-volume set covering all the fundamentals of the game, The Elementary Go Series, with the publication of  In the Beginning by Ishigure and Life and Death by Kosugi and Davies. By 1984, the set was complete, when Ishi Press published Nagahara and Bozulich's Handicap Go. Meanwhile, Bozulich continued to translate and publish Japanese material for the nascent Western go-playing community, selecting volumes such as Kageyama's Lessons in the Fundamentals of Go and Kage's Secret Chronicles of Handicap Go, and a series of books about basic opening strategies: The Power of the Star-Point (Takagawa), The Chinese Opening: The Sure Win Strategy (Kato) and The 3–3 Point: Modern Opening Theory (Cho). 

In 1977, the Japan Go Association ceased publication of Go Review, their English-language magazine. Working closely with Power, Bozulich published a quarterly magazine Go World which continued through 129 issues, ceasing publication in 2013.  For many years Go World was the major source in English for comprehensive analysis of top Japanese tournament games.

Kiseido 
In 1982 Bozulich founded Kiseido Publishing Company, publishing Invincible: The Games of Shusaku. This biography and game collection by John Power is about Honinbo Shusaku, the most famous Japanese player from the 1800s.  Kiseido became more active in the 1990s, when Bozulich produced two more multi-volume sets of instructional material: the five volume Mastering the Basics, and the ten volume Get Strong at Go series. Kiseido continues to publish other books as well, such as The Go Player's Almanac, The World of Chinese Go and An Introduction to Modern Fuseki: Korean Style.

Go World 
Richard Bozulich has written or published more than one hundred books and magazine and newspaper articles about the game of go. He is the world's most prolific author of go materials in English. Richard Bozulich is the publisher of Go World magazine. He has a regular Go column in The Daily Yomiuri, Japan's largest English-language newspaper. He lives in Chigasaki, Japan and has worked as a professor of mathematics, physics and chemistry at a local college. His father was from Zadar county, Croatia.

Bibliography 
 All About Ko (2007) 
 The Basics of Go Strategy (2007) 
 501 Tesuji Problems (2005) 
 Making Good Shape (2002) 
 One Thousand and One Life-and-Death Problems (2002) 
 Five Hundred and One Opening Problems (2002) 
 Get Strong at Tesuji (2002) 
 Get Strong at Attacking (2002) 
 Get Strong at Invading (2000)  
 The Go Player's Almanac (2001) 
 The Second Book of Go (Beginner and Elementary Go Books) (1998) 
 Get Strong at Handicap Go (1998)   
 Get Strong at the Endgame (1997)  
 Get Strong at Life and Death (1997)  
 Get Strong at the Opening (1996)   
 Get Strong at Joseki, Volume 1 (1995)   
 Get Strong at Joseki, Volume 2 (1996)    
 Get Strong at Joseki, Volume 3 (1996) 
 Geometries, Groups and Algebras in the Nineteenth Century – A History 
 Magic of Go: A Complete Introduction to the Game of Go (1988)  
 An Introduction to Go (1984)  
 Handicap Go (1982) 
 Modern Joseki and Fuseki, Vol. 1: Parallel Fuseki, Ishi Press 1968, reprinted 2006 
 Modern Joseki and Fuseki, Vol. 2: The Opening Theory of Go, Ishi Press 1971, reprinted 2006 
 The Middle Game of Go or "Chubansen", Ishi Press, 1971,

References

External links 
Kiseido Publishing Company

1936 births
Living people
Go (game) writers
American Go players
American book editors
American instructional writers
University of California, Los Angeles alumni
UC Berkeley College of Letters and Science alumni
American expatriates in Japan